Danilia kuroshio is a species of sea snail, a marine gastropod mollusk in the family Chilodontidae.

Description
The size of the shell varies between 7 mm and 13 mm.

Distribution
This marine species occurs off the Philippines.

References

External links
 

kuroshio)
Gastropods described in 1968